FKM Nové Zámky is a Slovak football team, based in the town of Nové Zámky. The club was founded in 1907.

References

External links 

  

Nove Zamky
Association football clubs established in 1907
1907 establishments in Slovakia